

A–B
Cleveland Abbe
Aristotle
David Bates
Francis Beaufort
Tor Bergeron
Jacob Bjerknes
Vilhelm Bjerknes
Howard B. Bluestein
Bert Bolin
Léon Teisserenc de Bort
Harold E. Brooks
Keith Browning
David Brunt
C.H.D. Buys Ballot
Horace R. Byers

C–D
Jule Gregory Charney
Coching Chu
Isaac Cline
Balfour Currie
John Dalton
Robert Davies-Jones
William Morris Davis
Igor Delijanić
Jean-André Deluc
Charles A. Doswell III
Heinrich Wilhelm Dove

E–F
V. Walfrid Ekman
Kerry Emanuel
John Farrah
William Ferrel
Rich Fields
John Park Finley
Michael Fish
Robert FitzRoy
Bert Foord
Benjamin Franklin
Tetsuya Theodore Fujita

G–H
Francis Galton
Allison Göhler
William M. Gray
Thomas P. Grazulis
Willis Ray Gregg
George Hadley
Edmond Halley
Julius von Hann
Kenneth Hare
Brian Hoskins
Luke Howard

J–K
Robert Johns
John Knox
Wladimir Köppen
Shen Kuo

L–N
Hubert Lamb
Christopher Landsea
Leslie R. Lemon
Johannes Letzmann
Richard Lindzen
Mònica López
Edward Norton Lorenz
David M. Ludlum
Paul Markowski
Charles F. Marvin
Patrick McTaggart-Cowan
Pomponius Mela
Milutin Milanković
James T. Moore
Joel Myers
Aili Nurminen

P–R
Erik Palmén
Allen Pearson
Sir Cuthbert Peek, 2nd Baronet
Jan Pelleboer
Sverre Petterssen
José P. Piexoto
Ron Przybylinski
William John Macquorn Rankine
Gandikota V. Rao
Erik N. Rasmussen
Lewis Fry Richardson
Carl-Gustav Arvid Rossby
François van Rysselberghe

S–T
Horace-Bénédict de Saussure
Bob Simpson
John Strutt, 3rd Baron Rayleigh
George James Symons
Geoffrey Ingram Taylor
Tetsu Tamura
Reed Timmer

U–V
Vilho Väisälä
Bernard Vonnegut

W–Z
Roger Wakimoto
Alfred Wegener
Heinrich von Wild
Edgar W. Woolard
Joshua Wurman
Rely Zlatarovic
Nadia Zyncenko

Weather presenters 
Benjamin Abell
Derek Brockway
Jim Cantore
Suzanne Charlton
Spencer Christian
Barbara Edwards
Michael Fish
Gregory S. Forbes
Gary England
Bill Giles
Dick Goddard
Mel Goldstein
Gerrit Hiemstra
John Hope
Janice Huff
John Kettley
Colleen Jones
Ulrika Jonsson
Jörg Kachelmann
Don Kent
David Letterman
Siân Lloyd
Ian McCaskill
Jan Pelleboer
Tony Perkins
Audrey Puente
James Spann
Odd Reinsfelt
Larry Rice
Al Roker
Willard Scott
Tom Skilling
Harold Taft
Harry Volkman
Wincey Willis

See also 
The Weather Channel
List of meteorologists on The Weather Channel
 List of Russian meteorologists

External links 
Certified Consulting Meteorologist List on Association of Certified Meteorologists

Meteorologists
 
Meteorologists